Events from the year 1955 in Denmark.

Incumbents
 Monarch – Frederick IX
 Prime minister – Hans Hedtoft (until 29 January), H. C. Hansen

Events

Sports

Badminton
 2326 March  All England Badminton Championships
 Finn Kobberø and Jørgen Hammergaard Hansen win gold in Men's Double
 Finn Kobberø and Kirsten Thorndahl win gold in Mixed Double

Football
 9 June  AGF wins the 1954–55 Danish Cup by defeating Aalborg Chang 40 in the final.

Date unknown
 Evan Klamer (DEN) and Kay Werner Nielsen (DEN) win the Six Days of Copenhagen sox-day track cycling race.

Births
 26 August – Heidi Ryom, dancer (died 2013) 
 30 December – Sanne Salomonsen, singer
 Monica Ritterband, artist and journalist

Deaths
 17 March – Gunnar Asgeir Sadolin, businessman (born 1873)
 27 June – Martin A. Hansen, writer (born 1909)
 15 July – Einar Utzon-Frank, sculptor (born 1888)
 31 July  Sophy A. Christensen, furnituremaker (born 1867)
 24 September – Jonathan Leunbach, doctor (born 1884)
 12 December – Esther Carstensen, women's rights activist and journal editor (born 1873)

See also
1955 in Danish television

References

 
Denmark
Years of the 20th century in Denmark
1950s in Denmark
1955 in Europe